In the geometry of hyperbolic 4-space, the great 120-cell honeycomb is one of four regular star-honeycombs. With Schläfli symbol {5,5/2,5,3}, it has three great 120-cells around each face. It is dual to the order-5 icosahedral 120-cell honeycomb.

It can be seen as a greatening of the 120-cell honeycomb, and is thus analogous to the three-dimensional great dodecahedron {5,5/2} and four-dimensional great 120-cell {5,5/2,5}. It has density 10.

See also 
 List of regular polytopes

References 
Coxeter, Regular Polytopes, 3rd. ed., Dover Publications, 1973. . (Tables I and II: Regular polytopes and honeycombs, pp. 294–296)
Coxeter, The Beauty of Geometry: Twelve Essays, Dover Publications, 1999  (Chapter 10: Regular honeycombs in hyperbolic space, Summary tables II,III,IV,V, p212-213)

Honeycombs (geometry)
5-polytopes